The Ryukyu mouse ('Mus caroli'') is a species of rodent in the family Muridae.
It is found in Cambodia, China, Indonesia, Japan, Laos, Malaysia, Taiwan, Thailand, and Vietnam.

References

Rats of Asia
Mus (rodent)
Mammals of Japan
Rodents of Southeast Asia
Rodents of Indonesia
Rodents of Cambodia
Rodents of Malaysia
Rodents of China
Rodents of Laos
Rodents of Thailand
Rodents of Vietnam
Mammals described in 1902
Taxa named by J. Lewis Bonhote
Taxonomy articles created by Polbot